Henriette Gezundhajt (born March 25, 1963) is a professor of French linguistics at Glendon College and York University.

Gezundhajt was born in France and studied Enunciative Linguistics at the University Paris 7 until 1988. She received her Ph.D. in French linguistics from the University of Toronto in 1995 and has taught at several universities in Toronto, including Ryerson University (now Toronto Metropolitan University), York University and U of T. She has published on the morphology of adverbs. She has created several websites dedicated to the study of linguistics. Among them, "Sur Les Sentiers de La Linguistique" offers a comprehensive introductory guide to French linguistics. She is also a licensed hypnotherapist and has written on the evolution of the historical origins of hypnotism.

References

External links
 Sur les sentiers de la linguistique

1963 births
Living people
Linguists from France
Women linguists
Academic staff of the University of Toronto
Academic staff of York University
Academic staff of Toronto Metropolitan University
Hypnotherapists
Academic staff of Glendon College